Simon Green (born 30 March 1976), known by his stage name Bonobo, is a British musician, producer, and DJ based in Los Angeles. He debuted with a trip hop aesthetic, and has since explored more upbeat approaches as well as jazz and world music influences. His electronic sound incorporates the use of organic instrumentation, and is recreated by a full band in live performances.

Music career

1999–2009 

Green debuted in 1999 on the Tru Thoughts compilation When Shapes Join Together. His stage name Bonobo is a reference to the Bonobo chimpanzee species. Following the releases of the EP Scuba, released on Brighton based label Fly Casual Recordings, and the single "Terrapin", Bonobo was offered label deals with XL recordings and Mute records, but he chose to remain in Tru Thoughts.

His first album Animal Magic was released on the same label in 2000 to mixed reviews. Paul Cooper of Pitchfork stated that it "breaks no new ground for chill-out", while PopMatters said Bonobo "[showcases] smooth breakbeat loops, synth sounds, and aforementioned dub effects. [And his] electronic music draws on live playing." Reviewer Dean Carlson also said that the album "slowly takes shape as a solid debut of narcoleptic downtempo." In spite of reactions, Animal Magic has given Bonobo a cult following. Its accompanying compilation album titled "One Offs...", was issued in 2002 and contains reworked songs and rarities.

In 2001, Bonobo was signed to Coldcut's label Ninja Tune and in 2003, he released Dial 'M' for Monkey. John Bush of AllMusic stated in a review that Bonobo's influences were drawn more towards alternative rock and world music rather than hip-hop or trip hop. The album tracks "Pick up" and "Flutter" were featured in the snowboarding game SSX on Tour.

In 2005, Bonobo contributed to the Solid Steel series, with It Came from the Sea. The mix features several exclusive tracks as well as remixes and re-edits. His third album, entitled Days to Come, was released on 2 October 2006. An AllMusic review states that "[Bonobo] breathes new life into a well-worn genre." With the album as well as his future work, he featured vocalists such as Bajka, thus "adding [an] organic and vibrant musicality that's rare in electronic music." Days to Come was voted Best Album of 2006 by Gilles Peterson's listeners. The song "Nightlite" appeared on UEFA Champions League 2006–2007, and "Recurring" was used in a surfing film broadcast on Fuel TV.

2010–2015 

The song "The Keeper" featuring vocals by Andreya Triana was released in September 2009 as the lead single from his fourth album Black Sands, released in March 2010. A BBC review by Paul Clarke stated that "Green has progressed from predominantly sample-based production to more live instrumentation [and] has become equally adept at mastering [...] multi-layered atmospheres." in the same review, Clarke has also commented that the songs "We Could Forever" "saddles an Afro-inflected guitar and skittish flute to deep sub-bass" and "Kiara" combines "oriental strings with cut-up beats." After their collaboration for Black Sands, Green produced Andreya Triana's debut album Lost Where I Belong. The song "Kong" was used during a scene in an artist's studio in the eighth episode of the second season of House of Cards.

In February 2012, Black Sands Remixed was released on Ninja Tune, featuring tracks from the original Black Sands record remixed by electronic producers such as Machinedrum, Lapalux, Floating Points, and Mark Pritchard.

The first single off the next Bonobo album, "Cirrus", was given its worldwide debut on Gilles Peterson's BBC Radio 6 programme on 19 January 2013. The album is titled The North Borders and was set for release on 1 April 2013, but was released early in its digital format after a promotional copy was leaked prior to the planned launch date. The North Borders marked his first UK and US album chart entries, where they respectively reached numbers 34 and 122. The track "Cirrus" was featured as the closing song of the pilot episode for the AMC show Halt and Catch Fire.

He produced the song, "Pulls" by DELS for his 2014 album Petals Have Fallen, which was released under Big Dada; a sister label of Ninja Tune.

2016–present 
Bonobo released his sixth album, Migration, in January 2017. In an interview with Billboard, Bonobo said that he conceived the album from "living and being in various locations", as he toured extensively and did not "have a home base for about a year". The album and the track Bambro Koyo Ganda have been nominated for the 60th Annual Grammy Awards for Best Dance Recording and Best Dance/Electronic Album. The album peaked higher in the UK chart (number 5) and in the US (number 59). In 2018, Bonobo's "Migration" album also won Album of the Year at the 2017 Electronic Music Awards and Bonobo was also nominated for Live Act of the Year.

On 1 July 2019, Bonobo released a new song, "Linked", online. "Linked" was later nominated for Best Dance Recording at the 62nd Grammy Awards, but lost to "Got to Keep On" by The Chemical Brothers.

The following year, Bonobo remixed Michael Kiwanuka's song "Final Days".

Bonobo's seventh studio album Fragments was released on 14 January 2022. Five singles were released ahead of the album's release. The first single, "Rosewood", debuted on 6 October 2021, followed by "Tides" on 20 October 2021, a collaboration with Jamila Woods. A third single, "Otomo", was released on 10 November 2021, a collaboration with O'Flynn, followed by "Shadows", with Jordan Rakei, on the 1st of December. The fifth and final single, "From You", with Joji, was released on 3 January 2022.

He was nominated for the Brit Award for British Dance Act at the 2023 Brit Awards.

Musical style

Bonobo's sound is oriented on beats and samples but typically "soothing", combining influences ranging from club music to world music. Pitchfork named him a key figure in the 2000s downtempo electronica scene while The Guardian associated him with the recent popularity of "ambient world electronica". While his earliest work was firmly based in trip hop, his style soon became more upbeat and delved into genres such as jazz (which has led him to be described as a nu jazz artist) and traditional Indian music. He has collaborated with various artists, including Bajka, Andreya Triana, Erykah Badu, and Rhye who contributed vocals to songs on his last four albums Days to Come, Black Sands, The North Borders, and Migration, respectively. He also performed with Robert Luis of the Tru Thoughts label under the aliases Nirobi and Barakas.

Whilst often touring solo, and performing DJ sets and residencies, in 2010 Bonobo opted to start touring with a full band for the Black Sands tour. The band plays live renditions of studio material, with a singer, keyboardist, guitarist, saxophonist, string section, electronics, and drummer, often with improvisations and solos. His albums employ sampling, for example 'Behind the Light' (from Pick Up EP, 2003) uses a clip of 'Judy' from John Renbourn.

Discography

Albums

Live albums and EPs
 Live Sessions (2005)
 The North Borders Tour - Live (2014)

Singles and EPs

 Scuba EP (2000)
 Terrapin EP (2000)
 Silver EP (2000)
 The Shark EP (2000)
 Kota EP (2002)
 Pick Up EP (2003)
 Flutter EP (2003)
 "Nightlite" / "If You Stayed Over" (2006)
 "Nightlite" (Zero dB Reconstruction/Bonobo Remixes) (2006)
 The Keeper (featuring Andreya Triana) EP (2009)
 "Stay the Same" (featuring Andreya Triana) (2009)
 "Eyesdown" (featuring Andreya Triana) (2010)
 "Cirrus" (2013)
 "First Fires" (featuring Grey Reverend) (2013)
 Ten Tigers EP (2014)
 The Flashlight EP (2014)
 Bambro Koyo Ganda EP (2017)
 "Ibrik" (2019)
 "Linked" (2019)
 "Heartbreak" (with Totally Enormous Extinct Dinosaurs) (2020)
 "Loom" (with Ólafur Arnalds) (2020)
 "6000 Ft." (with Totally Enormous Extinct Dinosaurs) (2020)
 "Rosewood" (2021)
 "Tides" (featuring Jamila Woods) (2021)
 "Otomo" (featuring O'Flynn) (2021)
 "Shadows" (featuring Jordan Rakei) (2021)
 "From You" (featuring Joji) (2022)
 "ATK" (2022) 
 "Defender" (2022)

Remix albums
 One Offs, Remixes & B-Sides (2002)
 Black Sands Remixed (2012)

Other albums
 Sweetness (2002)
 Solid Steel Presents: It Came from the Sea (2005)
 Late Night Tales: Bonobo (2013)
 fabric presents: Bonobo (2019)

DVDs
 Live at Koko (2009)
 The North Borders Tour - Live (2014)

See also 
List of ambient music artists

References

External links

 
 
 Bonobo interview for Clash magazine, September 2006
 Profile at rcrdlbl.com
 Bonobo interview for the independent on album Migration, January 2017

1976 births
British trip hop musicians
Downtempo musicians
English electronic musicians
English DJs
English record producers
Living people
Musicians from Brighton and Hove
Ninja Tune artists
Nu jazz musicians